Philip Mustard (born 8 October 1982) is an English cricketer who most recently played for Gloucestershire and has also represented England. Mustard is a left-handed batsman and wicketkeeper, with a style likened to that of Australia's Adam Gilchrist. Following success for Durham with both gloves and bat, averaging 49.61, and after an injury to England's keeper Matt Prior during the 2007 Twenty20 World Championship, Mustard was called up to the England squad to face Sri Lanka in the winter ODI series. He was named captain of Durham in May 2010.

Personal life
With partner Louise he has two sons. Mustard was educated at Usworth Comprehensive, and is a keen football fan who played at Manchester United until aged 13, and then Middlesbrough FC until aged 15, and he continues to play during the winter months. He also uses this time to travel to Dijon in France where he spreads the oracle regarding what he deems to be the greatest condiment. The merits of grainy mustard always stood out to Phil as opposed to its smooth counterpart, which he quoted as being ‘ransid’ and ‘just not cricket’. His nickname, "Colonel", stems from the suspect Colonel Mustard from the murder-mystery board game Cluedo. His brother Alan Mustard plays for Chester-le-Street CC at Ropery Lane and helped the side win the 45-over National Knockout Competition in 2009 defeating Spencer CC from London in the final at The County Ground in Derby.

International career
Mustard first played for England in the U-19 squad, beginning his cricket career in 2000. He began first-class cricket in 2002 and Twenty20 in 2003 for Durham.  During the English winter in 2003, Mustard travelled to Hobart in Tasmania, Australia. He played for the Glenorchy Cricket Club, as well as helping and coaching young and upcoming players. During 2007, he scored nearly 1000 first-class runs and won two trophies. He scored a fast 49 off 38 balls to secure a victory for Durham in September, before being given out lbw. Subsequent replays revealed that the ball would have missed the stumps, however Mustard's appeals to be allowed to continue were controversially turned down by umpire Ian Gould. Nevertheless, Mustard's 2007 season earned him a call-up to the England side to replace the injured Prior for England's tour of Sri Lanka at the end of 2007. Mustard received much support for his international call-up, Shane Warne rated Mustard as "the best one-day wicketkeeper-batsman in England" and, along with Paul Collingwood, likened him to Gilchrist in ability. Durham chief executive David Harker stated that Mustard deserved to be called up, stating that his 2007 season was "fantastic".

Mustard had a quiet start to his debut tour, opening the batting and scoring 17 in a warm-up match against a Sri Lanka Cricket XI. This was followed by a more explosive 27 from 17 balls in the first match against the full Sri Lankan team, where England fell to a 119-run defeat, Mustard making the joint-second highest score in the England innings. England won the 3rd ODI by two wickets, but Mustard only scored 14. In the 4th ODI, where England recorded their first series victory in the sub-continent since 1986–87, Mustard was caught and bowled for 19.

During England's tour of New Zealand Mustard opened the batting for the initial two Twenty20 matches. Though falling early in the first, Mustard scored a rapid 40 from 24 balls in the second, and kept wicket in a manner that Jonathan Agnew describes as "slick and unfussy." In the 4th ODI on 20 February 2008 he hit a rapid 83, his highest ODI score, as England raced to 340, in a match which was ultimately tied. His final appearance for England was in the 5th ODI, when New Zealand won the series.

References

External links
Official Site

1982 births
Living people
England One Day International cricketers
England Twenty20 International cricketers
English cricketers of the 21st century
English cricketers
Auckland cricketers
Durham cricketers
Durham Cricket Board cricketers
Durham cricket captains
Lancashire cricketers
Gloucestershire cricketers
Mountaineers cricketers
Fortune Barishal cricketers
Cricketers from Sunderland
Northumberland cricketers
Wicket-keepers